The Union Theatre is a fringe theatre situated in the borough of Southwark in London, England. It was established in 1998 by Sasha Regan, and has a reputation for staging musicals.

Original premises
In 1998, Sasha Regan took the initiative to convert a disused paper warehouse on Union Street near Southwark station into a functioning theatre. Set beneath railway arches, it was one of the more distinctive theatrical spaces in London.  When its landlord, the publicly owned infrastructure body Network Rail, wished to redevelop the site for offices,  a campaign was started to save the theatre, and also other small businesses nearby which were given just 12 weeks notice to relocate. The Union Theatre was given a stay of execution.

Relocation
In 2016, after almost twenty years in its original premises, the Union Theatre moved into new Network Rail premises just across the road from its original site.  The theatre's new home, which "will keep the heart of the Union intact," offers a restaurant, rehearsal room, and some offices to let.  Enhanced facilities include tiered seats and an increased seating capacity.

Notable productions 
 HMS Pinafore (2007). 
 Sweeney Todd (2008) by Stephen Sondheim 
 Assassins (2008) by Stephen Sondheim
 The Pajama Game (2008) by Adler and Ross
 The Mikado (2008) by Gilbert and Sullivan (an all-male version)
 'A Man of No Importance' (2009) by Stephen Flaherty and Lynn Ahrens with book by Terrence McNally transferred to the West End playing at The Arts Theatre Leicester Square 
 Once Upon A Time At The Adelphi (2010), London premier of a new musical

References

External links
 http://www.uniontheatre.biz

Theatres in the London Borough of Southwark